Hellinsia discors is a moth of the family Pterophoridae that is endemic to Guyana.

The wingspan is 12‑13 mm. The forewings are ochreous whitish, with a few scattered fuscous and black specks. A slender suffused dark fuscous streak runs along the costa from the base to the cleft. The hindwings are rather dark grey. Adults are on wing from January to March.

References

Moths described in 1913
discors
Endemic fauna of Guyana
Moths of South America